129 (one hundred [and] twenty-nine) is the natural number following 128 and preceding 130.

In mathematics
129 is the sum of the first ten prime numbers.

129 is the product of only two primes, 3 and 43, making 129 a semiprime. Since 3 and 43 are both Gaussian primes, this means that 129 is a Blum integer.

129 is a repdigit in base 6 (333).

129 is a happy number.

129 is a centered octahedral number.

In the military
 Raytheon AGM-129 ACM (Advanced Cruise Missile) was a low observable, sub-sonic, jet-powered, air-launched cruise missile used by the United States Air Force
 Soviet submarine K-129 (1960) was a Soviet Pacific Fleet nuclear submarine that sank in 1968
  was a United States Navy Mission Buenaventura-class fleet oilers during World War II 
  was a Crosley-class high speed transport of the United States Navy
  was the lead ship of her class of destroyer escort in the United States Navy
  was a United States Navy Haskell-class attack transport during World War II
  was a United States Navy Crater-class cargo ship during World War II
  was a United States Navy Auk-class minesweeper for removing naval mines laid in the water
 Agusta A129 Mangusta is an attack helicopter originally designed and produced by Italian company Agusta
 The 129th Rescue Wing (129 RQW) is a unit of the California Air National Guard

In transportation
 LZ 129 Hindenburg was a German zeppelin which went up in flames while landing on May 6, 1937
 London Buses route 129 is a Transport for London contracted bus route in London
 STS-129 was a Space Shuttle mission to the International Space Station, flown in November 2009 by the shuttle Atlantis''.

In other fields
129 is also:
 The year AD 129 or 129 BC
 129 AH is a year in the Islamic calendar that corresponds to 746–747 CE
 129 Antigone is a main belt asteroid
 The atomic number of unbiennium, an element yet to be discovered
A film format: 129 film
 Sonnet 129 by William Shakespeare

See also 
 List of highways numbered 129
 United Nations Security Council Resolution 129

References 

Integers